Adam is a bronze sculpture by Colombian artist Fernando Botero, installed outside Seattle's Federal Reserve Bank Building at the intersection of 2nd and Madison, in the U.S. state of Washington. The statue is approximately 12 feet tall and covered in a brown patina.

Part of Martin Selig's art collection, the work was created in 1996 and acquired in 2016. Botero has created three pairs of statues depicting Adam and Eve (sometimes called Adam and Eve); the sculpture of Eve owned by Martin Selig is in an unknown location, and the other pairs are installed at the Time Warner Center in New York City and at Hotel Michael in Singapore.

See also

 1996 in art

References 

Bronze sculptures in Washington (state)
Cultural depictions of Adam and Eve
Downtown Seattle
Outdoor sculptures in Seattle
Sculptures of men in Washington (state)
Statues in Seattle